Sir Michael Caine  (born Maurice Joseph Micklewhite; 14 March 1933) is an English actor. Known for his distinctive Cockney accent, he has appeared in more than 160 films in a career spanning seven decades and is considered a British film icon. He has received various awards including two Academy Awards, a BAFTA, three Golden Globe Awards, and a Screen Actors Guild Award. As of 2017, the films in which Caine has appeared have grossed over $7.8 billion worldwide. Caine is one of only five male actors to be nominated for an Academy Award for acting in five different decades. In 2000, he received a BAFTA Fellowship and was knighted by Queen Elizabeth II for his contribution to cinema.

Often playing a Cockney, Caine made his breakthrough in the 1960s with starring roles in British films such as Zulu (1964), The Ipcress File (1965), The Italian Job (1969), and Battle of Britain (1969). During this time he established a distinctive visual style wearing thick horn-rimmed glasses combined with sharp suits and a laconic vocal delivery; he was recognized as a style icon of the 1960s. He solidified his stardom with roles in Get Carter (1971), The Last Valley (1971), The Man Who Would Be King (1975), The Eagle Has Landed (1976), and A Bridge Too Far (1977). 

Caine received two Academy Awards for Best Supporting Actor for his roles as Elliot in Woody Allen's comedy Hannah and Her Sisters (1986), and as Dr. Wilbur Larch in Lasse Hallström's drama The Cider House Rules (1999). His other Oscar-nominated films include Alfie (1966), Sleuth (1972), Educating Rita (1983), and The Quiet American (2002). Other notable performances include in the films California Suite (1978), Dressed to Kill (1980), Mona Lisa (1986), Little Voice (1998), Quills (2000), Children of Men (2006), and Youth (2015). 

Caine is also known for his performance as Ebenezer Scrooge in The Muppet Christmas Carol (1992), and for his comedic roles in Dirty Rotten Scoundrels (1988), Miss Congeniality (2000), Austin Powers in Goldmember (2002), and Secondhand Lions (2003). Caine portrayed Alfred Pennyworth in Christopher Nolan's The Dark Knight Trilogy (2005–2012). He appeared in Nolan's films The Prestige (2006), Inception (2010), Interstellar (2014) and Tenet (2020). He also appeared in the actions films Now You See Me (2013), and Kingsman: The Secret Service (2014).

Early life

Caine was born Maurice Joseph Micklewhite on 14 March 1933 at St Olave's Hospital in Rotherhithe, London, England. His English mother, Ellen Frances Marie (née Burchell; 1900–1989), was a cook and charwoman, while his father, also named Maurice Joseph Micklewhite (1899–1956), was a fish market porter of Romani, English and Irish heritage. He was brought up in his mother's Protestant faith.

Caine had an elder maternal half-brother named David William Burchell, and a younger full brother, Stanley Micklewhite. After the war, his father was demobilised, and the family were rehoused by the council in Marshall Gardens at the Elephant and Castle in a prefabricated house made in Canada, for much of London's housing stock had been destroyed during the Blitz in 1940–1941:

At the age of 10, Caine acted in a school play as the father of the ugly sisters in Cinderella. His fly was undone and he got a laugh, and he took on acting based on the laugh. In 1944, Caine passed his eleven-plus examination, winning a scholarship to Hackney Downs School (formerly The Grocers' Company's School). After a year there he moved to Wilson's Grammar School in Camberwell (now Wilson's School in Wallington, London), which he left at 16 after gaining a School Certificate in six subjects. He then worked briefly as a filing clerk and messenger for a film company in Victoria Street and film producer Jay Lewis in Wardour Street.

Military career
In 1952, Caine was called up to do his national service. Between 1952 and 1954 he served in the British Army's Royal Fusiliers, first at the British Army of the Rhine Headquarters in Iserlohn, West Germany, and then on active service in the Korean War.

Caine went into Korea feeling sympathetic to communism, coming as he did from a poor family, but the experience left him permanently repelled due to the human wave attacks practised by North Korea and China, which left him with the sense that their governments did not care about their citizens. He experienced a situation in which he thought he was going to die, the memory of which stayed with him and formed his character. In his 2010 autobiography The Elephant to Hollywood, he wrote that "The rest of my life I have lived every bloody moment from the moment I wake up until the time I go to sleep."

Caine has said that he would like to see the return of national service in Britain, to help combat youth violence, stating: "I'm just saying, put them in the Army for six months. You're there to learn how to defend your country. You belong to the country. Then, when you come out, you have a sense of belonging, rather than a sense of violence."

Acting career

1950s
Caine began his acting career at the age of 16 when he had a small, uncredited role in the 1950 film Morning Departure. A few years later at the age of 20 in Horsham, Sussex, he responded to an advertisement in The Stage for an assistant stage manager who would also perform small walk-on parts for the Horsham-based Westminster Repertory Company who were performing at the Carfax Electric Theatre. Adopting the stage name "Michael White", in July 1953 he was cast as the drunkard Hindley in the company's production of Wuthering Heights. He moved to the Lowestoft Repertory Company in Suffolk for a year when he was 21. It was here that he met his first wife, Patricia Haines. He has described the first nine years of his career as "really, really brutal" as well as "more like purgatory than paradise". He appeared in nine plays during his time at the Lowestoft Rep at the Arcadia Theatre with Jackson Stanley's Standard Players.

When his career took him to London in 1954 after his provincial apprenticeship, his agent informed him that there was already a Michael White performing as an actor in London and that he had to come up with a new name immediately. Speaking to his agent from a telephone booth in Leicester Square, London, he looked around for inspiration, noted that The Caine Mutiny was being shown at the Odeon Cinema, and decided to change his name to "Michael Caine". He joked on television in 1987 that, had a tree partly blocking his view been a few feet to the left, he might have been called "Michael Mutiny". (Humphrey Bogart was his "screen idol" and he would later play the part originally intended for Bogart in John Huston's The Man Who Would Be King.) He also later joked in interviews that had he looked the other way, he would have ended up as "Michael One Hundred and One Dalmatians". In 1958, Caine played the minor role of a court orderly in a BBC Television adaptation of the story, The Caine Mutiny Court Martial.

Caine moved in with another rising cockney actor, Terence Stamp, and began hanging out with him and Peter O'Toole in the London party scene after he had become O'Toole's understudy in Lindsay Anderson's West End staging of Willis Hall's The Long and the Short and the Tall in 1959. Caine took over the role when O'Toole left to make Lawrence of Arabia and went on to a four-month tour of the UK and Ireland.

Caine's first film role was as one of the privates in George Baker's platoon in the 1956 film A Hill in Korea. The stars of the film were Baker, Harry Andrews, Stanley Baker and Michael Medwin, with Stephen Boyd and Ronald Lewis; Robert Shaw also had a small part. Researcher Pete Dicks also notes that Caine played a German officer in the 1958 film THE TWO HEADED SPY’ starring Jack Hawkins - with whom he appeared in ZULU. Caine also appeared regularly on television in small roles. His first credited role on the BBC was in 1956, where he played Boudousse in the Jean Anouilh play The Lark. Other parts included three roles in Dixon of Dock Green in 1957, 1958 and 1959, prisoner-of-war series Escape (1957), and the crime/thriller drama Mister Charlesworth (1958).

1960s

Caine continued to appear on television, in serials The Golden Girl and No Wreath for the General, but was then cast in the play The Compartment, written by Johnny Speight, a two-hander also starring Frank Finlay. This was followed by main roles in other plays including the character Tosh in Somewhere for the Night, a Sunday-Night Play written by Bill Naughton televised on Sunday 3 December 1961, another two-hander by Johnny Speight, The Playmates, and two editions of BBC plays strand First Night, Funny Noises with Their Mouths and The Way with Reggie (both 1963). He also acted in radio plays, including Bill Naughton's Looking for Frankie on the BBC Home Service (1963).

A big break came for Caine when he was cast as Meff in James Saunders' Cockney comedy Next Time I'll Sing To You, when this play was presented at the New Arts Theatre in London on 23 January 1963. Scenes from the play's performance were featured in the April 1963 issue of Theatre World magazine.

When this play moved to the Criterion in Piccadilly with Michael Codron directing, he was visited backstage by Stanley Baker, one of the four stars in Caine's first film, A Hill in Korea, who told him about the part of a Cockney private in his upcoming film Zulu, a film Baker was producing and starring in. Baker told Caine to meet the director, Cy Endfield, who informed him that he already had given the part to James Booth, a fellow Cockney who was Caine's friend, because he "looked more Cockney" than Caine did. Endfield then told the 6'2" Caine that he did not look like a Cockney but like an officer, and offered him a screen test for the role of a snobbish, upper class officer after Caine assured him that he could do a posh accent. Caine believes Endfield offered him, a Cockney, the role of an aristocrat because, being American, he did not have the endemic British class-prejudice. Though he tested poorly, Endfield gave him the part that would make him a film star.

Location shooting for Zulu took place in Natal, South Africa, for 14 weeks in 1963. According to his 2010 autobiography The Elephant to Hollywood, Caine had been signed to a seven-year contract by Joseph E. Levine, whose Embassy Films was distributing Zulu. After the return of the cast to England and the completion of the film, Levine released him from the contract, telling him, "I know you're not, but you gotta face the fact that you look like a queer on screen." Levine gave his contract to his Zulu co-star James Booth.

Subsequently, Caine's agent got him cast in the BBC production Hamlet at Elsinore (1964) as Horatio, in support of Christopher Plummer's Hamlet. Horatio was the only classical role which Caine, who had never received dramatic training, would ever play. Caine wrote, "...I decided that if my on-screen appearance was going to be an issue, then I would use it to bring out all Horatio's ambiguous sexuality."

Caine's roles as effete-seeming aristocrats were to contrast with his next projects, in which he was to become notable for using a regional accent, rather than the Received Pronunciation then considered proper for film actors. At that time his working-class Cockney speech stood out to American and British audiences alike, as did the Beatles' Liverpudlian accents. Zulu was followed by two of Caine's best-known roles: the rough-edged petty-crook-turned-spy Harry Palmer in The Ipcress File (1965) and the titular womanising young Cockney in Alfie (1966). In a 2016 interview Caine cited Alfie as his favourite film of his career, saying, "it made me a star in America as well, and it was my first nomination for an Academy Award". He went on to play Harry Palmer in a further four films, Funeral in Berlin (1966), Billion Dollar Brain (1967), Bullet to Beijing (1995) and Midnight in Saint Petersburg (1996). Caine made his first film in Hollywood in 1966, after an invitation from Shirley MacLaine to play opposite her in Gambit. During the first two weeks, whilst staying at the Beverly Hills Hotel, he met long-term friends John Wayne and agent "Swifty" Lazar. Wayne was a fan of Caine's performance in Alfie and suggested to Caine, "Speak slow and speak low". Caine was always grateful for that advice. Caine starred in the film The Magus (1968) which, although BAFTA-nominated for Best Cinematography, failed at the box office.

Caine starred in the 1969 comedy caper film The Italian Job as Charlie Croker, the leader of a Cockney criminal gang released from prison with the intention of doing a "big job" in Italy to steal gold bullion from an armoured security truck. One of the most celebrated roles of his career, in a 2002 poll his line "You're only supposed to blow the bloody doors off!" was voted the second-funniest line in film (after "He's not the Messiah, he's a very naughty boy" from Monty Python's Life of Brian), and favourite one-liner in a 2003 poll of 1,000 film fans. Culminating in a cliffhanger, The Italian Job has one of the most discussed end scenes in film; what happened to the coachload of gold teetering over the edge of a cliff has been debated in the decades since the film was released.

1970s

After working on The Italian Job with Noël Coward, and a role as RAF fighter pilot squadron leader Canfield in the all-star cast of Battle of Britain (both 1969), Caine played the lead in Get Carter (1971), a British gangster film. Caine continued with successes including Sleuth (1972) opposite Laurence Olivier, and John Huston's The Man Who Would Be King (1975) co-starring Sean Connery, which received widespread acclaim. The Times applauded the "lovely double act of Caine and Connery, clowning to their doom", while Huston paid tribute to Caine's improvisation as an actor: "Michael is one of the most intelligent men among the artists I've known. I don't particularly care to throw the ball to an actor and let him improvise, but with Michael it's different. I just let him get on with it."

In 1974, Caine appeared in The Black Windmill, co-starring Donald Pleasence. In 1976 he appeared in Tom Mankiewicz's screen adaptation of the Jack Higgins novel The Eagle Has Landed as Oberst (Colonel) Kurt Steiner, the commander of a Luftwaffe paratroop unit disguised as Polish paratroopers, whose mission was to kidnap or kill the then-British Prime Minister Winston Churchill, alongside co-stars Donald Sutherland, Robert Duvall, Jenny Agutter and Donald Pleasence. Caine also was part of an all-star cast in A Bridge Too Far (1977). In 1978, Caine starred in Silver Bears, an adaptation of Paul Erdman's 1974 novel of the same name, and co-starred in the Academy Award-winning California Suite.

In the late 1970s, Caine's choice of roles was frequently criticisedsomething to which he has referred with self-deprecating comments about taking parts strictly for the money. He averaged two films a year, but these included such films as The Swarm (1978) (although critically panned it was Academy Award-nominated for Best Costume Design), Ashanti (1979) and Beyond the Poseidon Adventure (1979).

1980s
In the early 1980s Caine appeared in The Island (1980), The Hand (1981), and had a reunion with his Sleuth co-star Laurence Olivier in The Jigsaw Man (1982).

During the 1980s Caine enjoyed further acclaimed roles and awards attention. He co-starred with Julie Walters in Educating Rita (1983), for which he won a BAFTA and a Golden Globe Award. In 1986, he portrayed the neurotic Elliot in Woody Allen's ensemble comedy Hannah and Her Sisters, starring Barbara Hershey, Dianne Wiest, and Mia Farrow. For his performance he won his first Academy Award for Best Supporting Actor. Caine also played a suave English conman, opposite a clumsy American played by Steve Martin, in the crime comedy Dirty Rotten Scoundrels (1988), directed by Frank Oz. The film earned him a Golden Globe Award nomination.

Caine's other successful films (critically or financially) were the 1980 Golden Globe-nominated slasher film Dressed to Kill, the 1981 war film Escape to Victory featuring Sylvester Stallone and footballers from the 1960s and 1970s, including Pelé and Bobby Moore, the 1982 film Deathtrap, and the Academy Award-nominated Mona Lisa (1986). In 1987, Caine narrated Hero, the official film of the 1986 FIFA World Cup. In 1988 he played Chief Insp. Frederick Abberline in the two-part TV drama Jack the Ripper, which co-starred Jane Seymour and was produced to coincide with the 100th anniversary of the notorious Jack the Ripper murder spree in Victorian London.

Despite his success in the 1980s, Caine also appeared in some poorly received films such as Blame It on Rio (1984), the Dick Clement and Ian La Frenais comedy Water (1985), the fourth and final film in the Jaws franchise, Jaws: The Revenge (1987), and Without a Clue (1988) (portraying Sherlock Holmes). Caine's commitment to filming Jaws: The Revenge in the Bahamas meant that he was unable to receive his Academy Award for Hannah and Her Sisters in person and Dianne Wiest accepted it on his behalf. On Jaws: The Revenge, Caine said "I have never seen the film, but by all accounts it was terrible. However, I have seen the house that it built, and it is terrific."

1990s

In the 1990s, Caine found good parts harder to come by. He played the mysterious bartender Mike in Mr. Destiny in 1990 and appeared with Roger Moore in Bullseye! (1990). A high point came when he played Ebenezer Scrooge in The Muppet Christmas Carol (1992). Having been chosen by Brian Henson, Caine stated: "I'm going to play this movie like I'm working with the Royal Shakespeare Company. I will never wink, I will never do anything Muppety. I am going to play Scrooge as if it is an utterly dramatic role and there are no puppets around me." He played the beleaguered stage director Lloyd Fellowes in the film adaptation of Noises Off (1992). He also played a villain in the Steven Seagal film On Deadly Ground (1994). He was in two straight to video Harry Palmer sequels and a few television films. However, Caine's reputation as a pop icon was still intact, thanks to his roles in films such as The Italian Job and Get Carter. His performance in Little Voice (1998) was seen as something of a return to form, and won him a Golden Globe Award. Better parts followed, including The Cider House Rules (1999), for which he won his second Academy Award for Best Supporting Actor.

2000s

In the 2000s, Caine appeared in the comedy Miss Congeniality (2000) as the refined pageant coach opposite Sandra Bullock as the undercover FBI agent. The film was a massive box office success and Caine earned praise for his comic turn. That same year Caine also appeared in Philip Kaufman's controversial yet acclaimed film Quills (2000) as Dr. Royer-Collard opposite Geoffrey Rush, Kate Winslet, and Joaquin Phoenix. In 2001, Caine starred in the ensemble dramedy Last Orders starring Helen Mirren, Bob Hoskins, and Tom Courtenay. Caine's next film The Quiet American (2002) won him great critical acclaim, earning him his sixth Academy Award nomination. Caine also earned a Golden Globe Award and British Academy Film Award for his performance.

Several of Caine's classic films have been remade, including The Italian Job, Get Carter, Alfie and Sleuth. In the 2007 remake of Sleuth, Caine took over the role Laurence Olivier played in the 1972 version and Jude Law played Caine's original role. Caine is one of the few actors to have played a starring role in two versions of the same film. In an interview with CNN, Law spoke of his admiration for Caine: "I learned so much just from watching how he monitored his performance, and also how little he has to do. He's a master technician and sometimes he was doing stuff I didn't see, I couldn't register. I'd go back and watch it on the monitor, it was like 'Oh my God, the amount of variety he's put in there is breathtaking".

Caine also starred multiple comedies during this time, including playing Austin's father in Austin Powers in Goldmember (2002). In 2003 he co-starred with Robert Duvall, and Haley Joel Osment in the family comedy Secondhand Lions. Caine played family elder Henry Lair in the 2004 film Around the Bend. Also in 2005, he played as Isabel's (Nicole Kidman) father in Bewitched alongside Will Ferrell and Shirley MacLaine.

In 2005, he was cast as Bruce Wayne's butler Alfred Pennyworth in Batman Begins, the first movie in the new Batman film series known as The Dark Knight Trilogy. In 2006, he appeared in Alfonso Cuaron's acclaimed dystopian drama Children of Men alongside Clive Owen and Julianne Moore as well as Nolan's mystery thriller The Prestige starring Hugh Jackman and Christian Bale. In 2007 he appeared in Flawless, and in 2008 and 2012 he reprised his role as Alfred in Christopher Nolan's critically acclaimed Batman sequels The Dark Knight and The Dark Knight Rises as well as starring in the British drama Is Anybody There?, which explores the final days of life.

It was reported by Empire magazine that Caine had said that Harry Brown (released on 13 November 2009) would be his last lead role. Caine later clarified that he had no intention of retiring, stating that "You don’t retire in this business; the business retires you."

2010s

Caine appeared in Christopher Nolan's science fiction thriller Inception as Prof. Stephen Miles, Cobb's (Leonardo DiCaprio) mentor and father-in-law. The film was a financial and critical success, earning 8 Academy Award nominations including Best Picture. He voiced Finn McMissile in Pixar's 2011 film Cars 2 and also voiced a supporting role in the animated film Gnomeo & Juliet. He also starred in the 2012 film Journey 2: The Mysterious Island, as Josh Hutcherson's character's grandfather; the film also featured Dwayne Johnson and Vanessa Hudgens.

Caine reprised his role as Alfred Pennyworth in the Batman sequel The Dark Knight Rises, which was released in July 2012. Caine later called The Dark Knight Trilogy, "one of the greatest things I have done in my life." In 2013, Caine appeared in the heist thriller Now You See Me starring alongside Jesse Eisenberg, Mark Ruffalo, Isla Fisher, Woody Harrelson, and Morgan Freeman. Caine played the role of Arthur Tressler, an insurance magnate and the Four Horsemen's sponsor. The film, despite receiving mixed reviews from critics, was a financial success at the box office and spawned a sequel, Now You See Me 2 (2016).

He appeared in Nolan's 2014 science-fiction film Interstellar as Professor Brand, a high-ranking NASA scientist, ideator of Plan A, former mentor of Cooper and father of Amelia. The film starred Matthew McConaughey, Anne Hathaway, and Jessica Chastain. In 2015, Caine co-starred in Matthew Vaughn's action spy comedy Kingsman: The Secret Service starring Colin Firth, Taron Egerton, and Samuel L. Jackson.
In May 2015 he starred in Paolo Sorrentino's Italian comedy-drama film Youth alongside Harvey Keitel, Rachel Weisz,  Paul Dano, and Jane Fonda. Caine appeared in the lead role of retired composer Fred Ballinger, where he and the film won great acclaim at its debut at the Cannes Film Festival. Caine received a London Film Critics' Circle Award for British Actor of the Year nomination for his performance. In October 2015, Caine read Hans Christian Andersen's "Little Claus and Big Claus" for the children's fairytales app GivingTales in aid of UNICEF, together with Sir Roger Moore, Stephen Fry, Ewan McGregor, Dame Joan Collins, Joanna Lumley, David Walliams, Charlotte Rampling and Paul McKenna.

In 2017, Caine was cast in a spoken cameo role in Christopher Nolan's action-thriller Dunkirk (2017), based on the Dunkirk evacuation of World War II, as a Royal Air Force Spitfire pilot, as a nod to his role of RAF fighter pilot Squadron Leader Canfield in Battle of Britain (1969). In 2018, Caine starred as Brian Reader in King of Thieves, which was based on the Hatton Garden safe deposit burglary of 2015.

2020s
In May 2019, Caine was cast as Sir Michael Crosby, a British Intelligence officer, in Christopher Nolan's Tenet (2020). The film starred John David Washington, Robert Pattinson, Elizabeth Debicki and Kenneth Branagh. The film was released during the COVID-19 pandemic in September 2020 after being delayed multiple times and became a box office disappointment, despite receiving positive reviews. Caine also appeared in the children's fantasy film, Come Away (2020) starring Angelina Jolie, David Oyelowo, and Gugu Mbatha-Raw. The film premiered at the Sundance Film Festival to mixed reviews, with critics praising its performances and lavish production design. In the 2021 film Twist, an adaptation of Charles Dickens’ Oliver Twist set in the present day, Caine plays Fagin. In interviews promoting the 2021 film Best Sellers, Caine suggested that he would not make another film, citing difficulty in walking and his new interest in novel-writing developed during the COVID-19 lockdowns. However, his representatives told Variety that he was not retiring from acting.

In popular culture

Caine is regarded as a British cultural icon, with Mairi Mackay of CNN stating: "Michael Caine has been personifying British cool since the swinging sixties. He has brought some of British cinema's most iconic characters to life and introduced his very own laid-back cockney gangster into pop culture. He doggedly retained a regional accent at a time when the plummy tones of Received Pronunciation were considered obligatory. It is a sweet irony that his accent has become his calling card." In 2015 The Times called Caine "the epitome of Sixties cool in his first outing as the secret agent Harry Palmer". A trailer for his second role as Palmer described him as possessing "horn rims, cockney wit and an iron fist". With his distinctive voice and manner of speaking, Caine is a popular subject for impersonators and mimics. Most Caine impressions include the catchphrase "Not a lot of people know that." The catchphrase emanates from Caine's habit of informing people of obscure "interesting facts" that he has collected. Referring to Caine as being the "biggest mine of useless information", Peter Sellers initiated the catchphrase when he appeared on BBC1's Parkinson show on 28 October 1972 and said:

Caine later spoke of how Sellers used his impression of him as his answering machine message in the 1970s: “I called Peter one day, he wasn't in. And there was me saying, 'My name is Michael Caine. I just want you to know that Peter Sellers is not in. Not many people know that.' He invented that 'not many people know that.' And then everybody who rang him, they got me saying, 'Not many people know that. Over the years Caine himself had parodied his catchphrase and his "interesting facts", and has imitated others' impressions of him. In an interview with Michael Parkinson in 2007, Caine commented on the impersonations of his voice, "I can do it. 'Hello. My name is Michael Caine. Not many people know that.' I sound like a bloody moron. You know where they've got me now? On birthday cards. 'It's your birthday today. Not many people know that'. Now they've got me on Satellite navigation. It's me going, 'take the second turn on the right, and you'll wind up right in the shit. In 1983, Caine used his "not a lot of people know that" phrase as a joke in the film Educating Rita.

The comedy sketch show Harry Enfield's Television Programme included a series of sketches in which Paul Whitehouse played a character called Michael Paine; an amalgam of previous Michael Caine impressions, who in a reference to Caine's character Harry Palmer from The Ipcress File wears oversized, thick-rimmed glasses and a trench coat. He introduces himself with the line, "My name is Michael Paine, and I am a nosy neighbour" and in a spoof of the stakeout at the beginning of The Ipcress File, recounts to the camera the 'suspiciously' mundane behaviour of his neighbours, before saying, "Not a lot of people know that I know that". Caine's Harry Palmer character (with the glasses, the girls, and disregard for authority) was among the many British pop cultural influences for Mike Myers’ Austin Powers films. At Myers’ request, Caine himself starred in Austin Powers in Goldmember (2002), with his portrayal of Nigel Powers, father of Austin Powers, spoofing Harry Palmer.

A parody of Caine appears in the animated series Ugly Americans, in the episode "The Dork Knight", which also parodies the film The Dark Knight. In the episode, Caine appears as himself, portrayed in the light of his Alfred Pennyworth interpretation, and constantly annoys the protagonists with endless anecdotes of his career.

The 2010 television series The Trip, starring Rob Brydon and Steve Coogan, featured improvised scenes in which the two leads argue over who can do the better Michael Caine impression. Among the lines they repeat in their attempts to outdo each other are, "You were only supposed to blow the bloody doors off!" and, "She was only sixteen years old"—from The Italian Job and Get Carter, respectively. Coogan and Brydon later did their impressions from a balcony at the Royal Albert Hall during a celebration of Caine's work, only to be interrupted by the real Caine informing them that they were out of shape: "For me, it's a full-time job."

Craig Ferguson ran segments on his show where he parodied Caine, usually while wearing a space suit. In a 2010 interview with The Telegraph, Caine spoke of the impersonations and how everyone he meets quotes lines at him, to the point he quotes them quoting him. When asked whether he is ever tired of telling his anecdotes, Caine stated: "I enjoy making people laugh. The trick is to tell them against yourself. If you praise yourself your stories aren't funny."

In 2018, Caine starred in a British Airways’ pre-flight safety video, appearing with six other British celebrities, including actresses Olivia Colman and Naomie Harris. Promoting the Flying Start children’s charity partnership between BA and Comic Relief, they are featured ‘auditioning’ in humorous sketches while also highlighting important safety messages.

Personal life

Caine lives in Leatherhead, Surrey, in a house with a movie theatre which cost him £100,000 to build. He is patron to the Leatherhead Drama Festival. He has also lived in North Stoke, Oxfordshire; Clewer, Berkshire; Lowestoft, Suffolk; and Chelsea Harbour, London. In addition, Caine owns an apartment at the Apogee in Miami Beach, Florida. He still keeps a small flat near where he grew up in London. Caine has published three volumes of memoirs, What's It All About? in 1992, The Elephant to Hollywood in 2010, and Blowing the Bloody Doors Off: And Other Lessons in Life in 2018.

Caine was married to actress Patricia Haines from 1954 to 1958. They had a daughter, Dominique (who was named after the heroine of Ayn Rand's novel, The Fountainhead). He dated Edina Ronay, Nancy Sinatra, Natalie Wood, Candice Bergen, Bianca Jagger, Jill St. John and Françoise Pascal. Caine has been married to actress and model Shakira Baksh since 8 January 1973. They met after Caine saw her in a Maxwell House coffee commercial and a friend gave him her telephone number. He called her every day for ten days until she finally agreed to meet him. They have a daughter, Natasha Haleema. As a Christian married to a Muslim, he says "no questions or issues ever come up" and describes his wife's beliefs as "very benign and peaceful."

Proud of his working class roots, Caine has discussed the opportunities his film career gave him: "I got to play football with Pelé, for God's sake. And I danced with Bob Fosse." He also became close friends with John Lennon, stating: "With John and I it was a case of bonding because we were both working class and we shared a sense of humour. We were pretending we weren't who people thought we were." His closest friends included two James Bond actors, Sean Connery and Roger Moore.

Some time after his mother died, Caine and his younger brother, Stanley, learned they had an elder half-brother named David. He suffered from severe epilepsy and had been kept in Cane Hill Mental Hospital his entire life. Although their mother regularly visited her first son in the hospital, even her husband did not know the child existed. David died in 1992.

In July 2016, Caine changed his name by deed poll to his long-time stage name in order to simplify security checks at airports. Caine stated that because the security guard often recognized him but was unaware of his real name, it would waste a considerable amount of his time as he tried to prove that he and "Maurice Joseph Micklewhite" were the same person:

"[A security guard] would say, 'Hi Michael Caine,' and suddenly I'd be giving him a passport with a different name on it. I could stand there for an hour. So I changed my name."

Political views
Caine has often been outspoken about his political views, referring to himself as a "left-wing Tory" influenced by both his working-class background and Korean War service. He left the United Kingdom for the United States in the late-1970s, citing the income tax levied on top earners by the Labour government of James Callaghan, which then stood at 83%. He lived in Beverly Hills during that time, but returned to the UK eight years later when taxes had been lowered by the Conservative government of Margaret Thatcher:

Following the launch of his film Harry Brown in 2009, Caine called for the reintroduction of national service in the UK to give young people "a sense of belonging, rather than a sense of violence".

In 2009, Caine publicly criticised the Labour government of Gordon Brown for its new 50% income tax rate on top earners and threatened to return to the United States if his taxes were increased further. During the run up to the 2010 general election, Caine publicly endorsed the Conservative Party and appeared with then-party leader David Cameron for the launch of a civilian non-compulsory "National Service" for sixteen-year-olds, although Caine stated he had previously supported New Labour under the leadership of Tony Blair in 1997. In July 2014, Caine was reported to have been a celebrity investor in a tax avoidance scheme called Liberty. In November 2014, Caine described the proposed mansion tax by then Labour leader Ed Miliband as "preposterous and silly".

Caine voted in favour of Brexit in the 2016 European Referendum, stating he would rather be a "poor master than a rich servant". He said he was a reluctant Leaver; "I don't know what to vote for. Both are scary. To me, you've now got in Europe a sort of government-by-proxy of everybody, who has now got carried away. Unless there is some extremely significant changes, we should get out."

In a 2010 Classic FM interview, Caine said that he had persuaded a doctor to deliberately give his father a fatal overdose when he was dying from liver cancer in 1955 and endorsed voluntary euthanasia.

Music and other interests
Caine is a fan of chill-out music, and he released a compilation CD called Cained in 2007 on the UMTV record label. He met his good friend Elton John and was discussing musical tastes, when Caine said that he had been creating chillout mix tapes as an amateur for years. Caine and Elton John had also appeared on the same episode of Parkinson, where they sang an impromptu version of the pub tune “Knees Up Mother Brown”. Also in music, Caine provided vocal samples for the Ska-pop band Madness for their 1984 hit "Michael Caine", as his daughter was a fan. He has sung in film roles as well, including Little Voice and for the 1992 musical film The Muppet Christmas Carol.

Caine quit his 80-a-day smoking habit in the early 1970s after a lecture by Tony Curtis. He is a fan of cricket. This was alluded to by Gary Oldman, who acted with Caine in The Dark Knight Rises, when he talked about Caine's acting methods: "It's, 'Take one'. He got it. 'Take two', got it. 'Take three', got it. He's just on the money. ... He doesn't fuck around because he wants to get back to cricket."

Trivia books written by Caine include Not Many People Know That!, And Not Many People Know This Either!, Michael Caine's Moving Picture Show, and Not a Lot of People Know This is 1988. Proceeds from the books went to the National Playing Fields Association, a UK charity for which Caine served as vice president, and which aims to protect and promote open spaces for sports and recreation in British cities and towns.

Partial filmography

Awards and honours

Caine has been nominated for an Oscar six times, winning his first Academy Award for the 1986 film Hannah and Her Sisters, and his second in 1999 for The Cider House Rules, in both cases as a supporting actor. His performance in Educating Rita in 1983 earned him the BAFTA and Golden Globe Award for Best Actor. Caine is one of only two actors nominated for an Academy Award for acting in every decade from the 1960s to 2000s (the other one being Jack Nicholson); Laurence Olivier was also nominated for an acting Academy Award in five decades, beginning in 1939 and ending in 1978, as were Paul Newman (1950s, '60s, '80s, '90s and 2000s) and Denzel Washington (1980s, '90s, 2000s, '10s, and '20s). Caine appeared in seven films that were ranked in the BFI's 100 greatest British films of the 20th century. He has appeared in seven films that featured in the British Film Institute's 100 greatest British films of the 20th century.

He was appointed a CBE in the 1992 Queen's Birthday Honours, and in the 2000 Birthday Honours he was knighted as Sir Maurice Micklewhite CBE by Elizabeth II at Buckingham Palace. In a tribute to his background, he stated: "I was named after my father and I was knighted in his name because I love my father. I always kept my real name—I'm a very private and family-orientated person." In 2000 he received a BAFTA Academy Fellowship Award.

In 2008, Caine was awarded the prize for Outstanding Contribution to Showbusiness at the Variety Club Awards. On 5 January 2011 he was made a Commander of the Ordre des Arts et des Lettres by France's culture minister, Frédéric Mitterrand. In May 2012, Caine was awarded the Honorary Freedom of the London Borough of Southwark as a person of distinction and eminence of the borough. In 2017, Caine was the recipient of the Golden Plate Award of the American Academy of Achievement. His Golden Plate was presented by Awards Council member Peter Jackson.

Bibliography
Caine has written three memoirs across several decades. He published the first, What's It All About?, in 1992, whose title is a reference to a song in his 1966 hit film Alfie. It was reviewed negatively in The New York Times, which called it an "archetypal show-business memoir" that was engaging but tainted by the book's "name-dropping, the sexual boasting, the sensitivity to slights". His second memoir, The Elephant to Hollywood, was published in 2010. Janet Maslin of The New York Times reviewed it positively, calling Caine a "charming raconteur" and "wittily self-deprecating".

 Bibliography

Notes

References

External links

 
 
 
 

 

 Michael Caine  at the American Film Institute Catalog
  in 2010
 
  compilation of film clips, 4 minutes
 PLAY DIRTY/Caine Special on Location in Spain
 Martyn Palmer, "Double act: Michael Caine and Jude Law (lunch and discussion)", The Times, 17 November 2007
 Charlie Rose video interview 3 February 2003
 IGN.com interview 18 March 2003
 200 years of Michael Caine's family tree
 Sir Michael Caine interview on BBC Radio 4 Desert Island Discs, 25 December 2009

1933 births
Living people
20th-century English male actors
20th-century English writers
21st-century English male actors
21st-century English writers
Actors awarded knighthoods
Audiobook narrators
BAFTA fellows
Best Actor BAFTA Award winners
Best Miniseries or Television Movie Actor Golden Globe winners
Best Musical or Comedy Actor Golden Globe (film) winners
Best Supporting Actor Academy Award winners
British Army personnel of the Korean War
British Eurosceptics
British people of English descent
British people of Irish descent
British people of Romani descent
Commanders of the Order of the British Empire
Commandeurs of the Ordre des Arts et des Lettres
Conservative Party (UK) people
English autobiographers
English Christians
English male film actors
English male television actors
English people of Irish descent
English Romani people
European Film Award for Best Actor winners
Knights Bachelor
Method actors
Male actors from London
Outstanding Performance by a Male Actor in a Supporting Role Screen Actors Guild Award winners
People educated at Hackney Downs School
People educated at Wilson's School, Wallington
People from Camberwell
People from Leatherhead
People from Rotherhithe
People from South Oxfordshire District
People from Southwark
Romani male actors
Royal Fusiliers soldiers
Writers from London
Yiddish-speaking people